Risøyhamn is a village in Andøy Municipality in Nordland county, Norway.  The village is located on the southern part of the island of Andøya.   The island of Andøya is connected to the neighboring island of Hinnøya by the Andøy Bridge at Risøyhamn.  The Hurtigruten coastal express boat has service to and from Risøyhamn twice a day.

References

Andøy
Villages in Nordland
Populated places of Arctic Norway